= Juan Arricio =

Bolivian footballer (born 1923)

Personal information
- Date of birth: 11 December 1923
- Place of birth: Bolivia
- Position: Midfielder

Senior career*
Years	Team	Apps	(Gls)
- Ayacucho La Paz

International career
- Bolivia
- * Club domestic league appearances and goals

Juan Arricio (born 11 December 1923, date of death unknown) was a Bolivian football midfielder who played for Bolivia in the 1950 FIFA World Cup. He also played for Ayacucho La Paz. Arricio is deceased.
